Rockwell Lake is a lake in Hubbard County, in the U.S. state of Minnesota.

Rockwell Lake was named for Charles H. Rockwell, a pioneer who settled near its banks.

See also
List of lakes in Minnesota

References

Lakes of Minnesota
Lakes of Hubbard County, Minnesota